South Konawe Regency (Kabupaten Konawe Selatan) is a regency of Southeast Sulawesi Province, Indonesia. It covers an area of 4,200.89 km2 and had a population of 264,587 at the 2010 Census and of 308,524 at the 2020 Census. The official estimate as at mid 2021 was 312,674. The administrative centre is in the town of Andoolo.

Administrative districts 
At the time of the 2010 Census, the South Konawe Regency was divided into twenty-two districts (kecamatan), but since 2010, three additional districts have been created in 2014 by the division of existing districts - Andoolo Barat, Kolono Timur and Sabulakoa. These districts are tabulated below with their areas and their populations at the 2010 Census and 2020 Census, together with the official estimates for mid 2021. The table also includes the locations of the district administrative centres, the number of administrative villages (rural desa and urban kelurahan) in each district, and its postal code.

Notes: (a) the 2010 population of Andoolo Barat District is included in the figure for Andoolo District, from which it was cut out in 2014. (b) includes the offshore island of Pulau Tawatawaro. (c) the 2010 population of Kolono Timur District is included in the figure for Kolono District, from which it was cut out in 2014.  (d) includes 20 offshore islands. (e) includes 3 offshore islands. (f) includes the offshore islands of Pulau Lara and Pulau Moramo. 
(g) the 2010 population of Sabulakoa District is included in the figure for Landono District, from which it was cut out in 2014.

Climate
South Konawe has a tropical rainforest climate (Af) with moderate rainfall from August to November and heavy rainfall from December to July. The following climate data is for the town of Andoolo, the seat of the regency.

References

Regencies of Southeast Sulawesi